El Hamma, Khenchela  is a town and commune in Khenchela Province, Algeria. According to the 1998 census it had a population of 10,702.

References

Communes of Khenchela Province